Larchwood station is a shelter flag stop Via Rail station located in Larchwood, Ontario on the Sudbury – White River train.

External links
 Via Rail page for Larchwood train station

Via Rail stations in Ontario
Railway stations in Greater Sudbury